Cold Heart is a 2001 erotic thriller film starring Nastassja Kinski and Jeff Fahey. The film conveys the atmosphere of conspiracy, the essence of which becomes clear to an innocent victim at the very last moment.

Plot
Dangerous psychopath Sean Clark tries to kill a woman and gets into a prison psychiatric hospital. Thanks to the efforts of a talented psychiatrist Dr. Phil Davis, Clark is released prematurely. Davis explains that he acts on behalf of Sean's father but mentions that his father does not want to meet or communicate with Sean. Davis gives Clark money and takes him to his new home, reminding that the main condition for the Sean's release is his weekly visits to Davis.

After that, Sean starts a new life. He gets a job with a large company, the owner of which turns out to be Davis's wife, Linda, who falls in love with Sean. In turn, Sean performs her every wish and even says to Davis that he loves his new employer.

Meanwhile, Linda suspects that her husband has an extramarital affair. Secretive phone calls, leavings for conferences (which he does not attend)—all of this convince her that she is right. One day, Linda plans to attend the presentation of her film. Her assistant, who was to accompany her, proposes to replace her with Sean. On a trip, a whirlwind romance sparks between Linda and Sean. Blinded by passion, Linda cannot suspect that all the events are the parts of her husband's insidious plan. He wants to profit from her death and chooses the most reliable weapon—a convicted maniac, whose guilt no one will doubt.

Cast
 Nastassja Kinski as Linda Cross 
 Jeff Fahey as Dr. Phil Davis
 Josh Holloway as Sean Clark 
 Hudson Leick as Julia  
 Janne Campbell as Natalie 
 Lincoln Myerson as Mr. Peterson 
 Bob Sattler as Detective Harris

External links 
 
 

2000s erotic thriller films
American erotic thriller films
2001 films
2000s English-language films
Films produced by Boaz Davidson
2000s American films